Elections in Tripura have been conducted since 1952.

For the first Indian general election of 1951-52, voters in Tripura directly elected two members of the Lok Sabha and elected 30 members of an Electoral College which subsequently convened to elect a single member for the Rajya Sabha.

For elections in 1957 and 1962, voters in Tripura elected 30 members to a Territorial Council (with an extra two members appointed).  In 1963 the Territorial Council was dissolved and the members transferred to a newly created Legislative Assembly.  The first elections to the Legislative Assembly occurred in 1967.  In March 1972, the Legislative Council was enlarged to 60 members as a result of Tripura attaining statehood.

Lok Sabha elections 
The Lok Sabha election results for Tripura are as follows:

Vidhan Sabha Elections

References